Major Saab is a 1998 Indian Hindi-language action film starring Amitabh Bachchan, Naveen Nischol, Ajay Devgn, Sonali Bendre, Nafisa Ali and Ashish Vidhyarthi.

Plot 
The plot concerns playboy Virendra Pratap Singh aka Vir. A clause in the will of his wealthy father forces him to enter a military academy in order to inherit. Vir's repeated attempts to get himself discharged are foiled by Major Jasbir Singh Rana. Then Virendra falls in love with Nisha, the sister of a gangster named Shankar. Shankar wants Nisha to marry the son of his friend Parshuram Bihari and hatches a plot to separate the couple, by pretending to accept Vir, however soon beats him up badly and attempts to break both his arms and legs. Aferthat, Major Jasbir then begins training Vir to regain his strength and to fight those who wronged him and win Nisha back in the end. Finally, both are accepted by the Major.

Cast 
 Ajay Devgn as Virendra Pratap Singh aka 'Veer'
 Amitabh Bachchan as Maj. Jasbir Singh Rana
 Sonali Bendre as Nisha
 Nafisa Ali as Dr. Priya Rana
 Ashish Vidhyarthi as Shankar
 Mohan Joshi as Parshuram Bihari
 Shahbaaz Khan as Vicky
 Naveen Nischol as Brig. Satish Khurana
 Mushtaq Khan as Hanuman Prasad
 Avtar Gill as Commissioner of Police
 Dinesh Hingoo Special Appearance as Jai Singhaniya (Virendra's solicitor)
 Kulbhushan Kharbanda as Raja Thakur (guest appearance)
 Siddharth Ray
 Jasbir Thandi as Cadet Amrik singh
 Pradeep Rawat as Subeidar Singh

Production 
Many scenes of the film was filmed in Pune at National Defence Academy (NDA) including the song "Sona Sona".

Box office 
The film was a moderate success at the box office, it earned 18 crore. It was also the 9th highest-grossing film of the year (Bollywood films of 1998).

Soundtrack 
The music is composed by Anand Raj Anand and Aadesh Shrivastava. Lyrics are penned by Anand Raj Anand and Dev Kohli. Initially Anand Raj Anand wanted to sing the song 'Akeli Na Bazaar Jaya Karo' and 'Pyar Kiya toh Nibhana' by himself, but could not due to circumstances, about which he spoke in an interview. However, the whole album gained hugh popularity and tracks like 'Akeli Na Bazaar jaya karo', 'Sona Sona' and 'Pyaar Kiya toh Nibhana' became hit. In 2017, the song 'Pyar kiya toh Nibhana' was recreated with Armaan Malik and Shruti Pathak as singers. Then in 2021 it was recreated by Jonita Gandhi, Millind Gaba and Abhijeet Vaghani on T-Series
Mixtape.

Track listing

References

External links 

The Hindu article
Summary of the movie on Rediff

1998 films
1990s Hindi-language films
Films scored by Aadesh Shrivastava
Films scored by Anand Raj Anand
Indian action films
1998 action films